Grimminger is a German surname. Notable people with the surname include:

Jakob Grimminger (1892–1969), German SS officer
Johannes Grimminger (1914–1945), German military officer

See also
Mount Grimminger, mountain of Antarctica

German-language surnames